The 1936 Tripoli Grand Prix was a Grand Prix motor race held on 10 May 1936. This race was part of the 1936 Grand Prix Season as a non-championship race. The race was won by Achille Varzi in an Auto Union Type C.

Results

Race

References

Tripoli Grand Prix
Tripoli Grand Prix
Tripoli Grand Prix
Italian Grand Prix